Nikola Filipov (born 13 July 1965) is a Bulgarian judoka. He competed in the men's middleweight event at the 1992 Summer Olympics.

References

External links
 

1965 births
Living people
Bulgarian male judoka
Olympic judoka of Bulgaria
Judoka at the 1992 Summer Olympics
People from Haskovo
Sportspeople from Haskovo Province